The Compagnia Generale di Elettricità S.p.A. (General Electric Power Company) was an Italian joint-stock company founded in 1921 in Milan. The company was widely know in Italy as simple acronym CGE, it was primarily owned and managed by General Electric USA.

CGE manufactured electrical applications, simple high voltage transformers, generators, powerplants and engines for trains and trolleybuses in particular.
It manufactured a certain number of its products for the European market. In the transport sector, CGE was well known for its electric components that equipped many rolling stocks, 
trolley buses, railway and locomotive applications. During its active period, CGE competed against two Italian companies: Ansaldo and "Italian Tecnomasio Brown Boveri" (TIBB).

The company was later the EMC Traction Operating Unit of Ansaldo Transmissione e Distribuzione S.r.l. and was acquired by IMPulse NC, INC. in 2000.

References

Defunct manufacturing companies of Italy
Electronics companies of Italy
Manufacturing companies based in Milan